Stanisław Gądecki (born 1949) is the archbishop of Poznan, Poland. He is a Polish Roman Catholic Bishop, doctor of Theological Sciences, and archbishop of Poznań since 2002. and serves as president of the Polish Episcopal Conference from 2014 and Deputy President of the Council of the Bishops' Conferences of Europe from 2016.

Early life
He was born on 19 October 1949 in Strzelno. In 1967, he graduated from high school there. From 1967 to 1973 he studied philosophy and theology in Primatial Seminary, Gniezno and was ordained to the priesthood on 9 June 1973 in the Cathedral of Gniezno.

In 1973–1981 he studied at the Pontifical Biblical Institute in Rome, gaining a Bachelor's degree. From 1976 to 1977 he was in Franciscan Biblical Studies college in Jerusalem. From 1981 to 1982 he studied at the Pontifical University of St. Thomas Aquinas, where in 1982 he obtained a doctorate in Biblical Theology.

Career
He was a pastor in the Church of John the Baptist, the deputy rector of the theological seminar in Gniezno, and from 1992 to 2002 served as auxiliary bishop of Gniezno and titular bishop of Rubicon. 

On 28 March 2002 Pope John Paul II appointed him archbishop of Poznań. He served as deputy president of the Polish Episcopal Conference from 2004-2014, and was elected president in 2014.

In October 2015, Gądecki condemned "feelings of false compassion" in relation to a gay-rights campaign in Poland, and refused to change the church's approach to LGBT ministry during a meeting of the Synod of Bishops in Rome.

References

21st-century Roman Catholic archbishops in Poland
Bishops of Poznań
Living people
1949 births
People from Strzelno